NGC 725 is a spiral galaxy approximately 450 million light-years away from Earth in the constellation of Cetus. It was discovered by Francis Preserved Leavenworth on November 9, 1885 with the 26" refractor at the Leander McCormick Observatory.

See also 
 Spiral galaxy 
 List of NGC objects (1–1000)
 Cetus (constellation)

References

External links 
 
 
 SEDS

Spiral galaxies
Cetus (constellation)
725
6950
Astronomical objects discovered in 1885
Discoveries by Francis Leavenworth